Susan Walsh may refer to:
Susan Walsh (actress) (1948–2009), American actress
Susan Walsh (missing person)
Susan Walsh (swimmer) (born 1962), American swimmer
Susan Smith-Walsh (born 1971), Irish hurdler